A lemon tart is a dessert dish, a variety of tart. It has a pastry shell with a lemon flavored filling.

In the UK, lemon tart  consists of a pastry case (often made in a fluted tart tin) containing a baked lemon custard (usually composed of eggs, sugar, lemon juice and cream). Usually recipes include blind-baking before adding the custard. Sometimes, the tart is dusted with icing sugar prior to serving.

Alternatively, the lemon filling can be cooked in a saucepan and then added to the baked pastry case.

A dessert very similar to the lemon tart is the lemon pie, usually served for dessert, made with a crust usually made of shortcrust pastry and lemon custard filling. The lemon pie is prepared with a bottom pie crust. This pie is different from the lemon meringue pie, which has meringue on top. No upper crust is used, as in a cherry pie.

See also

References

External links
 

Tarts
Lemon dishes
French pastries
Monegasque cuisine
Fruit pies